Jose Lucas Santos Barbosa de Lima, known as Lucas Barbosa (born 1 April 1996) is a Brazilian football player. He plays for CS Maruinense.

Club career
He made his Austrian Football First League debut for SC Austria Lustenau on 17 March 2017 in a game against FC Liefering.

Ahead of the 2019/20 season, Barbosa joined Grazer AK on a 1-year contract with an option to a further year.

References

External links
 

1996 births
Living people
Brazilian footballers
Brazilian expatriate footballers
SC Austria Lustenau players
Grazer AK players
2. Liga (Austria) players
Association football forwards
Brazilian expatriate sportspeople in Austria
Expatriate footballers in Austria